The Laurel Formation, also known as the Laurel Limestone or the Laurel Dolomite, is a geologic formation in Indiana and Kentucky. It preserves fossils dating back to the Silurian period.

See also

 List of fossiliferous stratigraphic units in Indiana

References

 

Geologic formations of Indiana
Silurian southern paleotemperate deposits
Sheinwoodian
Homerian